Edgar Ainsworth may refer to
 
 Edgar Ainsworth (footballer) (1910–1952), British football player
 Edgar Ainsworth (artist) (1905–1975), British artist

See also
 John Edgar Ainsworth (1920–2004), American physicist
 Ainsworth (surname)
 Ainsworth (disambiguation)